Robert William Montana (October 23, 1920 – January 4, 1975) was an American comic strip artist who created the original likenesses for characters published by Archie Comics and in the newspaper strip Archie.

Early life
He was born in Stockton, California, to Roberta Pandolfini Montana and Ray Montana. Both were in show business: Roberta had been a Ziegfeld girl, and Ray performed banjo on the vaudeville circuit. As a result, Bob Montana traveled extensively as a child. He attended Haverhill High School in Haverhill, Massachusetts. and graduated from Manchester High School Central in Manchester, New Hampshire.

According to Jane (Donahue) Murphy, a high school classmate of Montana's, Archie and his friends were based on people from their hometown and high school. She said Archie Andrews was based on Donahue's cousin, Richard Heffernan; Veronica Lodge on Agatha Popoff, the daughter of the local football team's doctor; Jughead Jones on a mischievous teen named "Skinny" Linnehan; while Miss Grundy may have been based on a high school typing and shorthand teacher named Lundstrom; however, Haverhill's school librarian is also believed to be the model for Grundy.

Career
While freelancing at True Comics and Fox Comics, Montana created an adventure strip about four teenage boys and tried to sell it without success.

Archie Comics

Montana started working for MLJ Comics (which would later be known as Archie Comics). He was asked to work up a high school style comic strip story, featuring Archie Andrews.

The success of the Archie and friends story in MLJ Comics' Pep Comics (Dec. 1941) led MLJ to assign Montana to draw the first issue of Archie (Nov. 1942). Montana was soon drawing the Archie comic strip, doing both the daily and Sunday strip, which over the next 35 years ran in over 750 newspapers.

Personal life
Montana served 3½ years in WWII and was a sergeant at war's end; during this time, he met and married Peggy Bertholet. They had four children: Paige, Lynn, Ray and Don.

He died at age 54 of an apparent heart attack while cross-country skiing near his New Hampshire home.

References

External links
 
 Bob Montana Papers at Syracuse University
 
 

1920 births
1975 deaths
American comic strip cartoonists
American comics artists
American people of Italian descent
Archie Comics
Manchester Central High School alumni
People from Haverhill, Massachusetts
Artists from Stockton, California
Will Eisner Award Hall of Fame inductees
People from Meredith, New Hampshire